Rokycany District is a district in the Plzeň Region of the Czech Republic. Its capital is the town of Rokycany.

Administrative division
Rokycany District is formed by only one administrative district of municipality with extended competence: Rokycany.

List of municipalities
Towns are marked in bold and market towns in italics:

Bezděkov -
Břasy -
Březina -
Bujesily -
Bušovice -
Cekov -
Cheznovice -
Chlum -
Chomle -
Čilá -
Dobřív -
Drahoňův Újezd -
Ejpovice -
Hlohovice -
Holoubkov -
Hrádek -
Hradiště -
Hůrky -
Kakejcov -
Kamenec -
Kamenný Újezd -
Kařez -
Kařízek -
Klabava -
Kladruby -
Kornatice -
Lhota pod Radčem -
Lhotka u Radnic -
Liblín -
Líšná -
Litohlavy -
Medový Újezd -
Mešno -
Mirošov -
Mlečice -
Mýto -
Němčovice -
Nevid -
Osek -
Ostrovec-Lhotka -
Plískov -
Podmokly -
Příkosice -
Přívětice -
Radnice -
Raková -
Rokycany -
Sebečice -
Sirá -
Skomelno -
Skořice -
Smědčice -
Štítov -
Strašice -
Svojkovice -
Těně -
Terešov -
Těškov -
Trokavec -
Týček -
Újezd u Svatého Kříže -
Vejvanov -
Veselá -
Vísky -
Volduchy -
Všenice -
Zbiroh -
Zvíkovec

Geography

The terrain is hilly, most of the territory has the character of highlands. The territory extends into five geomorphological mesoregions: Křivoklát Highlands (centre and northeast), Plasy Uplands (northwest), Švihov Highlands (southwest), Brdy Highlands (southeast) and Hořovice Uplands (small part in the east).

The Berounka forms large part of the district border in west and north. Inside the territory there are no significant rivers. The longest river is Klabava, a tributary of the Berounka.

There are two protected landscape areas: Brdy and Křivoklátsko.

Demographics

Most populated municipalities

Economy
The largest employers with its headquarters in Rokycany District and at least 500 employers are:

Transport
The D5 motorway (part of the European route E50) from Prague to Plzeň and the Czech-German border passes through the district.

Sights

The most important monument in the district and the only one protected as a national cultural monument is the Hammer Mill at Dobřív.

The best-preserved settlements, protected as monument reservations and monument zones, are:
Ostrovec (monument reservation)
Rokycany
Dobřív
Jablečno
Lhota pod Radčem
Podmokly
Vejvanov

The most visited tourist destination is the Zbiroh Castle.

References

External links

Rokycany District profile on the Czech Statistical Office's website

 
Districts of the Czech Republic